Ralph Lee Presley Sr. (July 4, 1930 – February 2, 2022) was an American politician.

Presley was born in Rome, Georgia. He served in the United States Navy during the Korean War and was a pilot. Presley lived with his wife and family in Newnan, Georgia, and was a commercial pilot for Delta Airlines from 1955 to 1990. Presley served as mayor of College Park, Georgia, and was a Republican. Presley also served in the Georgia House of Representatives, Presley died at Piedmont Newnan Hospital in Newnan, Georgia, on February 2, 2022, at the age of 91.

References

1930 births
2022 deaths
People from Rome, Georgia
People from College Park, Georgia
People from Newnan, Georgia
Military personnel from Georgia (U.S. state)
Aviators from Georgia (U.S. state)
Delta Air Lines people
Republican Party members of the Georgia House of Representatives
Mayors of places in Georgia (U.S. state)